The 2020–21 Oregon Ducks men's basketball team represented the University of Oregon during the 2020–21 NCAA Division I men's basketball season. The Ducks, led by 11th-year head coach Dana Altman, played their home games at Matthew Knight Arena as members of the Pac–12 Conference.  They finished the season 21-7, 14-4 in Pac-12 Play to finish as regular season champions. They defeated Arizona State in the quarterfinals of the Pac-12 tournament before losing in the semifinals to Oregon State. They received an at-large bid to the NCAA tournament where they advanced to the Second Round due to a positive COVID-19 test from VCU. They defeated Iowa in the second round to advance to the Sweet Sixteen where they lost to USC.

Previous season

The Ducks finished the season 24–7, 13–5 in Pac-12 play to win the regular season Pac-12 championship. They were set to take on rival Oregon State in the quarterfinals of the Pac-12 tournament. However, the Pac-12 Tournament, along with all postseason tournaments, was cancelled amid the COVID-19 pandemic.

Off-season

Departures

Incoming transfers

2020 recruiting class

2021 recruiting class

Roster

Schedule and results

|-
!colspan=12 style=| Regular season

|-
!colspan=12 style=| Pac-12 tournament

|-
!colspan=12 style=| NCAA tournament

|-

Ranking movement

*AP does not release post-NCAA Tournament rankings.^Coaches did not release a Week 1 poll.

References

Oregon Ducks men's basketball seasons
Oregon
Oregon Ducks men's basketball
Oregon Ducks men's basketball
Oregon